Saeed Robinson (born 8 August 1990) is a Jamaican footballer who plays as a midfielder for Greek American AA in the Eastern Premier Soccer League.

Career

College & Amateur
Robinson played four years of college soccer split between Western Texas College and Grand Canyon University, between 2009 and 2012.

Robinson also played with USL PDL clubs FC Tucson and LA Misioneros.

Professional
Robinson signed with USL club Colorado Springs Switchbacks on 9 February 2015. Robinson ended his first season with the Colorado Springs Switchbacks with 3 goals and 1 assist in 22 appearances.

On 9 December 2015 it was announced that Robinson will return with the Colorado Springs Switchbacks for the 2016 USL Pro Season. On 15 March 2016 Robinson scored in a 4-0 preseason victory against Ventura County Fusion.

On 22 January 2020, Robinson made the move to USL Championship side El Paso Locomotive.

References

1990 births
Living people
Jamaican footballers
Jamaican expatriate footballers
Grand Canyon Antelopes men's soccer players
FC Tucson players
LA Laguna FC players
Colorado Springs Switchbacks FC players
North Carolina FC players
El Paso Locomotive FC players
Association football midfielders
Expatriate soccer players in the United States
USL League Two players
USL Championship players
North American Soccer League players
Jamaican expatriate sportspeople in the United States
Sportspeople from Kingston, Jamaica
Western Texas Westerners men's soccer players
Greek American AA players